Brit Awards 2019  was the 39th edition of the British Phonographic Industry's annual pop music show, the Brit Awards. It was  held on 20 February 2019 at The O2 Arena in London, with Jack Whitehall as the host for the second year running. Architect David Adjaye designed the BRIT statuette. BBC Radio 1, Live Lounge and Top of the Pops host Clara Amfo hosted the BRITs Are Coming Nominations Launch Show on 12 January 2019. Clara Amfo and Alice Levine were live from the Red Carpet before the Main Show on ITV2.

Hugh Jackman opened the ceremony with a song from The Greatest Showman soundtrack, and Pink closed the ceremony.

Performers

Pre-ceremony

Main show

Winners and nominees
The nominations were revealed on 12 January 2019.

Multiple nominations and awards

YouTube Music and Facebook hosts 
On 14 February 2019, it was announced that Capital FM Breakfast Show host Vick Hope and Todrick Hall would host the YouTube Music Live Stream from 7:45pm GMT and it was also announced on the same day, that Jamie Laing and Yasmin Evans would host the Facebook Red Carpet Live Stream from 4:30pm GMT.

References

External links
Brit Awards official website

Brit Awards
Brit Awards
BRIT Awards
Brit
Brit
February 2019 events in the United Kingdom